Banigama is a village development committee in Morang District in the Kosi Zone of south-eastern Nepal. At the time of the 1991 Nepal census it had a population of 6748 people living in 1280 individual households.

List of educational institutions
Higher Secondary Schools:
Public Higher Secondary School
Buddha English Boarding School
Pashupati Higher Secondary School

References

Village development committees in Morang District
Gramthan Rural Municipality